Serlo of Wilton ( 1105–1181) was a 12th-century English poet, a friend of Walter Map and known to Gerald of Wales. He studied and taught at the University of Paris. He became a Cluniac and then a Cistercian monk, and in 1171 he became abbot of L'Aumône Abbey, a Cistercian monastery between Chartres and Blois. He died in 1181.

Serlo's poems are in Latin, of which the most famous is Linquo coax ranis.

He is the subject of an 1899 essay by the French author Marcel Schwob, La légende de Serlon de Wilton.

Notes

Bibliography

Cluniacs
Medieval Latin poets
12th-century Latin writers
12th-century births
1181 deaths
English male poets
12th-century English writers
12th-century English poets